E-booking or eBooking (electronic booking), making a reservation or appointment for a service via the internet, may refer to:

 E-Booking (UK government project), a project of the UK Governments 'e-Government' program
Choose and Book, a software application for the National Health Service (NHS) in England 
NHS e-Referral Service, an electronic referral system developed for the Health and Social Care Information Centre
Computer reservations system, a computerized system used to conduct transactions
Internet booking engine, a website that allows consumers and travel agents to book travel
Airline reservations system, part of the passenger service systems (PSS)
Appointment scheduling software, allows businesses and professionals to manage appointments and bookings

See also
Electronic ticket, the digital ticket equivalent of a paper ticket
 Ebookers, an Orbitz company
 Booking.com, a travel fare aggregator website and travel metasearch engine, owned and operated by Booking Holdings